Manual High School can refer to several different high schools:

 Manual High School (Peoria, Illinois)
 Manual High School (Denver)
 Manual High School (Kansas City)
 duPont Manual High School in Louisville, Kentucky
 Emmerich Manual High School in Indianapolis, Indiana
 Manual Training High School in New York City, later renamed John Jay High School and now the site of the John Jay Educational Campus (Brooklyn)
 Northeast Manual Training School, a high school from 1903 to 2009 in Philadelphia
 Stivers Manual Training High School, now Stivers School for the Arts, in Dayton, Ohio